Life and Nothing But is a 1989 French film directed by Bertrand Tavernier. It was inspired by the novel by Albanian writer Ismail Kadare titled The General of the Dead Army.

Synopsis
Set in October 1920, it tells the story of Major Delaplane, a man whose job is to find the identities of unknown dead soldiers after World War I. He encounters two women looking for their lost men: Irène, an aristocrat, and Alice, a country girl. The movie is a sensitive examination of the deep psychological scars left behind by the war, clear of sentiment yet with delicately nuanced irony.

Cast
Philippe Noiret - Commandant Delaplane
Sabine Azéma - Irène de Courtil
Pascale Vignal - Alice
Maurice Barrier - Mercadot
François Perrot - Capitaine Perrin
Jean-Pol Dubois - André
Frédéric Pierrot - Marcel
Jean-Paul Comart - Fagot
Daniel Russo - Lieutenant Trévise
Michel Duchaussoy - Général Villerieux
Pascal Elso - The blind

Awards
The film was nominated for numerous awards. It won the BAFTA Award for Best Film Not in the English Language. It was also nominated for 11 César Awards, winning for Best Actor (Philippe Noiret) and Best Music.

Other films based on the book
The General of the Dead Army (Italian: Il generale dell'armata morta) is a 1983 Italian film starring Michel Piccoli, based on the novel, directed by Luciano Tovoli.
The Return of the Dead Army (Albanian: Kthimi i Ushtrise se Vdekur) is a 1989 Albanian film starring Bujar Lako, based on the novel, directed by Dhimitër Anagnosti.

References

External links
 

1989 films
French war drama films
1980s French-language films
Western Front (World War I) films
Films featuring a Best Actor César Award-winning performance
Films directed by Bertrand Tavernier
Films set in 1920
Films based on historical novels
Films based on Albanian novels
Best Foreign Language Film BAFTA Award winners
1980s French films